Sibsagar College, Joysagar,  is a college offering graduate and postgraduate courses affiliated with Dibrugarh University. The college is situated at the eastern bank of Joysagar Tank and is approximately 5 km southwest of Sivasagar town. In 1947, Padmadhar Chaliha founded the college and his son, Paragdhar Chaliha, was the chief architect. Initially affiliated with Gauhati University, from 1965 until the present, the school has been affiliated with Dibrugarh University. The college campus is 103 bighas of land, and the school contains 16 different departments.

Achievements

 Accredited as 'A' Grade College by NAAC in 2017.
 Received financial assistance from the State Govt. of Assam under "Buniyad Scheme" in 2005.
 Recognized by UGC as a "College with Potential for Excellence" in 2006
 Short-listed by UGC for conferring Autonomous Status, but pending approval of the State Govt. of Assam
 Short-listed by DST for Science Laboratories grant
 Recognized study centre of K K Handique State Open University in 2007
 Recognized by IGNOU as its Partner Institute under Convergence Scheme in 2008.
 Accorded permission by the Dibrugarh University to start BCA and PGDCA under regular mode in 2009.
 Awarded 'A' Grade by National Assessment and Accreditation Council (NAAC) vide approval of its 23rd Standing Committee on 28 March 2017.

Publication

Sibsagar College publishes The Journal of Front-line Research in Arts and Science. The journal publishes research papers, original  research papers; review articles, discussion of current developments in academia; and research updates, papers that explain recent developments for the average reader. The journal covers each of the disciples listed in the Departments section.

List of Departments

The school has the following scientific departments: Physics, Electronics, Computer Science, Chemistry, Mathematics, Statistics, Geology, Zoology, and Botany, as well as the following humanities departments:  English,  Assamese, Economics, Political Science, Education, History, Philosophy, and Library Science.

Regular Courses

Sibsagar College offers three-year degree courses through Dibrugarh University in areas of arts and science. The courses offered include postgraduate studies in Assamese, Economics, History, Political Science, Sociology, and Mathematics, under the Distance Education curricular of Dibrugarh University. The college acts as the University's main campus for the aforementioned courses. Six career oriented courses are also offered through UGC's Career Oriented Program. The college was awarded Partner Institute status by the Indira Gandhi National Open University (IGNOU) under its Convergence Scheme. The college also offers regular BCA and PGDCA programs through Dibrugarh University. It has accorded permission from the Dibrugarh University to start M.A Course in English(Full Time Regular Mode) from the Academic Session 2016–17. M.Sc  in Physics has also begun in the college   from the academic session 2017–18.

Prominent Alumni

 Late Dr. Nirmal Prova Bordoloi, Retd. Prof. And H.O.D., Assamese, Gauhati University.
 Late Dr. Lila Gogoi, Prof. And H.O.D., Assamese, Dibrugarh University.
 Nawab Imran Shah, Retd. H.O.D., Assamese, Sibsagar College, Joysagar and presently Principal, Arunnudoi College, Sivasagar.
 Mr. Dambaru Kakoty, Eminent writer and social worker, retd teacher, Dept. of Assamese, Sibsagar College.
 Dr. Dolon Konwer, Prof. and Ex. Head of the Non-conventional Energy Department, Tezpur, Central University.
 Dr. Jogen Phukan, Retd. Prof. and H.O.D., History, Guwahati University and visiting Professor to various other Universities, a noted Historian.
 Late Eva Achawe, noted former film actress.
 Punya Das, Comedy actor of repute in both local and Hindi Films.
 Jahnu Barua, National award winner and internationally acclaimed Film Maker and Director.
 Mr. Ankur Ranjan Changmai, News Editor, Dainik Janambhumi.

References

Sivasagar
Universities and colleges in Assam
Colleges affiliated to Dibrugarh University
Educational institutions established in 1947
1947 establishments in India